Casalciprano is a comune (municipality) in the Province of Campobasso in the Italian region Molise, located about  west of Campobasso.

Casalciprano borders the following municipalities: Busso, Castropignano, Frosolone, Sant'Elena Sannita, Spinete, Torella del Sannio.

References

Cities and towns in Molise